The 2013 S.League was the 18th season since the establishment of the S.League, the top professional football league in Singapore. It is known as the Yeo's Great Eastern S.League for sponsorship reasons.

The season began in February 2013 and ended in November 2013. Tampines Rovers defended their title and the 2013 edition featured 12 teams in the league after Gombak United decided to sit out of the league due to financial problems.

Tampines Rovers beat Warriors F.C. on 15 February 2013 with a 2-1 scoreline to lift the 2013 Charity Shield, kicking off the 2013 S.League season.

The league also saw a month-long break between 26 May 2013 and 26 June 2013 in order for the preliminary round of the RHB Singapore Cup and Starhub League Cup to take place.

Major changes

The following were the key changes of season 2013 as compared to the previous season:

 Gombak United sat out of the 2013 S.League, turning it into a 12-team competition.
 This new "2.5 round" format saw the 12 teams split up into two halves based on their league standings after the completion of two rounds of fixtures.
 The final ‘half’ round saw teams (i.e.: top six teams in one group, bottom six teams in another group) playing against each other in their respective groups.
 All points accumulated in the 2 rounds were carried into the final round. The final standings were then be decided at the end of this half round.
 The format for both Cup tournaments namely RHB Singapore Cup and Starhub League remained intact.
 The import quota was increased from four to five foreign players, with support promised from the league management should clubs be keen to engage a foreign marquee player in the new quota of five.
 The 2.4 km run replaced the "Beep Test" to gauge the fitness of the players with a minimum passing mark set at 10.15 minutes for outfield players and 12 minutes for goalkeepers. Monetary rewards were given out for players who hit the minimum passing mark of 8.30 minutes ($200) and 9 minutes ($100).
 There was an increase in prize monies for the league champions, first runners-up and second runners-up at $250,000, $125,000 and $60,000 respectively (up from $150,000, $75,000 and $40,000 respectively).
 The Singapore Cup winners, first runners-up and second runners-up had their share increased to $100,000, $60,000 and $40,000 respectively (up from $80,000, $40,000 and $20,000 respectively).

Teams

Managerial changes

Team Changes
Gombak United withdrew their participation in the league based on financial considerations.
Harimau Muda A was replaced by their 'B' side.
Geylang United reverted to Geylang International.
Singapore Armed Forces FC renamed themselves to Warriors FC.

Stadium changes

Harimau Muda B used the Pasir Gudang Stadium in Johor, Malaysia, a change from the previous season where Harimau Muda A used the Yishun Stadium as their home ground in 2012.

2013 S.League Season Kits

Foreign players

 Albirex Niigata (S) and Harimau Muda B are an all-Japanese and all-Malaysian team respectively and do not hire any foreigners.
 Players in bold are marquee player signings who command wages outside the monthly salary cap.
 Players in Asterisks(*) were players who arrived during the mid-season transfer window.

League table

Results

Matchday 1 - 22

Matchday 23 - 27

Season statistics

Goalscorers

Fastest Goal

Most Goals In A Single Match

Highest Scoring Match

Club Disciplinary Records

Updated to games played on 27 June 2013
Points are awarded based on 1 point for each yellow card and 3 points for each sending off (regardless of sending-offs via two yellow cards or one red card)

Cards Handed Out By Match Officials
Includes all competitive matches. The list is sorted by alphabetical order when total cards are equal.

Updated to games played on 27 June 2013
Points are awarded based on 1 point for each yellow card and 3 points for each sending off (regardless of sending-offs via two yellow cards or one red card)

Attendance figures 

There isn't any established attendance figures. Only 1 report on attendance for Round 1 between Young Lions vs Hougang where 1,586 spectators attended.

S-League Awards Night Winners

References

External links
 Official site

Singapore Premier League seasons
1
Sing
Sing